Linda Karlsson (born 21 July 1982), better known by her stage name Miss Li, is a Swedish singer and songwriter. Since beginning her career in the early-2000s, she has released a total of eight studio albums, and several of her songs have been featured in Swedish commercials as well as numerous American television series.

Life and career
Linda Karlsson was born on 21 July 1982 in Borlänge, Sweden. In her adulthood, she relocated to Stockholm.

Using the stage name Miss Li, she released her debut album, Late Night Heartbroken Blues, in 2006. Her single "Don't Try to Fool Me" has been featured on the Showtime original series Weeds, as well as Grey's Anatomy, both in 2007.

Her song "Bourgeois Shangri-La" from her fourth studio album, Dancing the Whole Way Home (2009), was used by Apple in the iPod Nano 5G television commercial, and her song "Oh Boy"  was used in a 2010 Volvo C70 commercial. Her track "True Love Stalker" was used in the television promo of an episode of Desperate Housewives. The track "Forever Drunk" was featured in the opening scene of Grey's Anatomy. Her song "My Heart Goes Boom" was featured on multiple adverts for the popular UK furniture store DFS in late 2012, shortly after her appearance on Så mycket bättre that same year. In 2013 "My Heart Goes Boom" was used in American television advertisements of women's clothes by White House Black Market. After an extensive tour promoting her seventh album, Wolves concluded in 2014, Miss Li stated she sank into a depression, and went into seclusion. She subsequently attended a songwriters' camp in Los Angeles, California, where she collaborated in the studio with Rihanna, writing a track for the artist's album Anti (2016). However, The unnamed track did not appear on the album, though Li stated that Rihanna had purchased the rights to it.

Miss Li released her eighth studio album, A Woman's Guide to Survival, in 2017. The song "Aqualung" from the album was featured in the debut video for the 2019 Volvo XC40. Her song, "I Can't Get You Off My Mind", is used for movie promos on the cable and satellite station Starz.

Discography

Albums

Compilation albums

EPs 
 Så mycket bättre 2012 – Tolkningar (2012)
 Så mycket bättre – Tolkningarna (2019)

Singles

Featured singles

Notes

References

1982 births
Living people
People from Borlänge Municipality
Swedish pop singers
English-language singers from Sweden
21st-century Swedish singers
21st-century Swedish women singers